Morgan Parriott (born 28th April 1995), known professionally as Call Me Karizma, is an American singer-songwriter and rapper from New Prague, Minnesota. His music tends to be within the hip hop and punk genres.

His music career started in 2015, when Parriott toured with American rappers Mod Sun and Blackbear and released his debut album, Uninvited, a year later. In 2018, he signed with Arista Records and released his first extended play (EP) The Gloomy Tapes, Vol. 1 with Vol. 2 following a year later. In 2020, he left Arista and released his second album To Hell With Hollywood.

Early life 
Morgan Parriott was born in 1995 and is originally from New Prague, Minnesota. He started writing songs at age 12.

Career 
In February 2015, whilst studying as sophomore (second year of study) in college he assisted American rappers Mod Sun and Blackbear in a 35-date tour as a result of fans tweeting at them. Parriott released his debut album Uninvited in 2016.

In summer 2018, he released his first extended play (EP) called The Gloomy Tapes, Vol. 1, as part of his three part The Gloomy Tapes EP series.

In 2018, Parriott signed to Arista Records. He released the single "Serotonin" on 30 November 2018 which explores themes of mental health, depression and anxiety, the first song he released with Arista. Also in November 2018, Parriott released a collaboration called "God Damnit" with American DJ, Illenium. Under Arista, The Gloomy Tapes, Vol 2 was released in February 2019. His lead single "Monster (under my bed)" of Vol. 2 was featured on the television show The Purge on the seventh episode of the second season. Additionally, the song according to Billboard, peaked at number 33 on the "Mainstream Rock Airplay" on 30 March 2019.

Parriott left Arista Records in March 2020. Additionally, he has opened for Wiz Khalifa and has worked with producer David Pramik. As of 2018, he has completed four tours of the United States.

In July 2021, Parriott signed to Thriller Records. Thriller is a new label founded by Bob Becker who also founded Fearless Records. Later in the year, Parriott toured in the United States to promote a new EP entitled Bleached Serpent. Several of the tour dates were sold out.

His music has been described as pop and post-pop, hip hop and punk. He is regarded as a singer, songwriter, and rapper. According to Substream Magazine, he has a strong fanbase in Germany, Russia, and Ukraine.

Discography

Albums 
Uninvited (2016)
To Hell With Hollywood (2020)
 Francis (2022)

EPs 
The Gloomy Tapes, Vol. 1 (2018)
The Gloomy Tapes, Vol. 2 (2019)
Bleached Serpent (Sept 24, 2021)

As featuring artist 
"Black Magic" (The Ready Set featuring Call Me Karizma) (2018)
"God Damnit" (Illenium with Call Me Karizma) (2018)
"Untouchable" (Futuristic featuring Call Me Karizma) (2019)
"Hello My Loneliness" (Delaney Jane featuring Call Me Karizma) (2019)
"F**k Up" (Gabriel Black featuring Call Me Karizma) (2019)
«Part of Me» (Три дня дождя featuring Call me Karizma) (2021)

References

Living people
American male singer-songwriters
Rappers from Minnesota
21st-century American rappers
Arista Records artists
21st-century American male musicians
Place of birth missing (living people)
People from New Prague, Minnesota
1995 births
Singer-songwriters from Minnesota